The Men's Field Hockey Qualifier for the 2011 Pan American Games was a field hockey series between Cuba and Brazil to determine the last entry into the field hockey competition at the 2011 Pan American Games for men. All games were played in  Rio de Janeiro, Brazil from February 3–6, 2011.

This series became necessary because Cuba decided to skip the 2010 Central American and Caribbean Games. Brazil would have qualified under the old qualifying system (third qualifying position from the 2009 Pan American Cup).

Results

Pool A

See also
Field hockey at the 2011 Pan American Games – Women's Qualifier

References

Men's Qualifier
Qualification tournaments for the 2011 Pan American Games
2011 Pan American Games Qualfier